Traditional climbing (or trad climbing) is a type of free climbing in rock climbing where the lead climber places the protection equipment while ascending the climbing route; when the lead climber has completed the route, the second climber (or belayer) then removes the protection equipment as they climb the route.  Traditional climbing differs from sport climbing where the protection equipment is already pre-drilled into the rock in the form of bolts. 

Traditional climbing carries a much higher level of risk than bolted sport climbing, as the climber may not have placed the protection equipment correctly (while trying to ascend the route), or there may be few opportunities to insert protection equipment (e.g. on very difficult routes).  Traditional climbing was once the dominant form of free climbing, but since the mid-1980s, the sport climbing (and its related form of competition climbing) has become more popular, and all subsequent grade milestones in rock climbing have been in sport climbing.

Description

Traditional climbing (or "Trad" climbing), is a form of free climbing (i.e. no artificial or mechanical device can be used to aid progression, unlike with aid climbing), performed in pairs, where the lead climber places climbing protection into the climbing route as they ascend.  The second climber (or belayer), removes this temporary climbing protection as they climb the route after the lead climber has reached the top.  Some consider the hammering in of pitons while climbing the route, as long as they are only for climbing protection and not to aid progression, to also be traditional climbing.

Traditional climbing differs from sport climbing which has climbing protection pre-bolted into the route (the lead climber just clips his rope into quickdraws attached to the bolts).  Traditional climbing differs from free solo climbing where no climbing protection is used whatsoever.

First free ascent

With the greater popularity of sport climbing, traditional climbing evolved to embrace some of its redpointing techniques in making a first free ascent (FFA).  The previously controversial practices of hangdogging (i.e. practicing on an abseil rope), and headpointing (i.e. practicing on a top rope) are now accepted by the leading traditional climbers.  Traditional climbers subsequently introduced the derived term "greenpointing" (or the Grünpunkt movement, as a play on the sport climbing Rotpunkt movement), to describe making the first free ascent of a pre-bolted sport-climb, but only using "traditional protection".

History
As 20th-century rock climbers began to free climb (i.e., avoiding any form of aid), they used traditional climbing techniques for protection.  Early traditional climbers relied on crude, and often unreliable, forms of homemade "passive" climbing protection such as pieces of metal or chockstones attached to slings.  With the development of "active" traditional climbing protection in the 1970s, called spring-loaded camming devices (or "friends"), the grades of technical difficulty that traditional climbers could safely undertake increased dramitically, and new grade milestones were set. However, by the mid-1980s, the leading traditional climbers were again facing technical challenges with minimal possibilities for traditional climbing protection, that required them to accept significant personal risks — Johnny Dawes's 1986 ascent of Indian Face being a notable example. 

At this time, French climbers such as Patrick Edlinger began to pre-drill bolts into the almost "blank" faces of Buoux and Verdon for protection (but not as artificial aid); this became known as sport climbing. It led to a dramatic increase in climbing standards — all future new grade milestones were set on sport climbing routes.  The increased safety of pre-drilled bolts also led to the development and popularity of competition climbing, and the emergence of the "professional" rock climber.  Sport climbing became the most popular form of rock climbing.

Protection

Equipment

Traditional climbing requires more rock climbing equipment than sport climbing as the lead climber needs to carry, and insert, protection devices as they climb the route.  The choice of equipment carried will depend on the type of route being attempted.  Some of the most difficult and dangerous traditional routes (e.g. Indian Face or Master's Edge) offer very little opportunity to insert protection into the rock, and thus the lead climber carries very little protective equipment.  Classic traditional climbs often involve crack climbing (e.g. Separate Reality) that offers greater opportunity for inserting protection — into the crack itself — and the lead climber will carry a lot more equipment to secure their safety.

Two main classes of protection are used in traditional climbing, namely: "passive" and "active". Passive protection devices include nuts, hexcentrics and tricams, and are metal shapes attached to wires or slings, which can be inserted into cracks and fissures in the rock that will act like temporary sport climbing bolts (to which quickdraws and the rope can be clipped into).  Active protection consists of spring-loaded camming devices (or "friends"), which are cams that dynamically adjust to the size of the crack or fissure in the rock, but also act like temporary sport climbing bolts.

Risk

The traditional climber has two key concerns when placing protection equipment during the climb.  

The first concern is the quality of the protection placements.  Where the placements are considered good and will hold the climber in the event of a major fall, they are called "bomb-proof" (i.e. they behave just like pre-drilled bolts).  However, when the placements are poor, and there is uncertainty that they will hold in the event of a major fall — risking a "zipper-fall" — they are described as "thin".  For example, when Johnny Dawes freed the traditional climb Indian Face (E9 6c) in 1986, the protection was so thin, Dawes assumed if he fell, the protection would rip out, and he would fall to his death.   

The other concern is the distance between the protection placements.  Where there are many protection placements with small gaps between them (e.g. 2 to 3 metres), then any fall will be short and less onerous; even if one placement fails/rips-out, there are more placements that might still hold.  However, large gaps between placements — known as a "run out" — means that any fall will be larger and will place more pressure on the existing placements to hold the fall.  Famous extreme traditional climbs such as Master's Edge (E7 6c) and Gaia (E8 6c) have notorious run-outs, where even if the protection holds, the falling climber has a high chance of hitting the ground, as spectacularly shown in the notable 1998 traditional climbing film, Hard Grit.

To reflect the greater risk of traditional climbing routes over sport climbing routes, an additional grade is often added to the route's grade of technical difficulty (i.e. how hard are the individual moves) to reflect the risks.  In the United Kingdom, this is known as the "adjectival" grade (Diff, VDiff, HS, VS, HVS, E1 to E11). In the United States, it takes the form of a suffix (PG — be careful, R — fall will cause injury, R/X — fall will cause serious injury, X — fall likely to be fatal).

Hardest routes

Pre sport climbing era

Before the emergence of sport climbing in the early 1980s, almost all new grade milestones in rock climbing were set by traditional climbers. From the early 1980s, leading European traditional climbers like Jerry Moffatt and Wolfgang Güllich crossed over to sport climbing, where all new grade milestones would be established from then onwards. Moffatt's own last traditional first free ascent was Master's Wall (E7 6b) in 1984, where he said afterward: "At that time to be respected, you really had to be putting up really scary new [traditional] routes. That was where it was at, in Britain at least. Master's Wall is probably where I risked most".

Post sport climbing era

While the status of traditional climbing waned during the rise of the safer disciplines of sport climbing (and its related sport of competition climbing), and latterly bouldering, contemporary traditional climbers continued to set new "traditional climbing" grade milestones. By 2023, the strongest male (e.g. Jacopo Larcher and Ethan Pringle) and female traditional climbers (e.g. Beth Rodden and Hazel Findlay) were climbing to approximately the same grade of circa . In contrast, the strongest male sport climbers (e.g.

As of 2023, the following traditional climbing routes (not sport climbing routes) are considered to be the hardest-ever ascended (in order of difficulty):

Tribe (ungraded, but possibly 5.14d or harder) in Cardarese, Italy, first free ascent (FFA) by Jacopo Larcher in 2019.

Blackbeard’s Tears (5.14c, 8c+) at Redwood, USA, FFA by Ethan Pringle in 2016.

Meltdown (5.14c, 8c+) in Yosemite, USA, FFA (and FFFA) by Beth Rodden in 2008.

Pura Pura (5.14c, 8c+) in Orco Valley, Italy, FA by Tom Randall in 2014.

Rhapsody (E11 7a, 5.14c R/X) in Dumbarton Rock, Scotland, FA by Dave MacLeod in 2006.

Magic Line (5.14c, 8c+) in Yosemite, pinkpointed by Ron Kauk in 1996, redpointed by Lonnie Kauk in 2018, FFFA by Hazel Findlay in 2019.

Century Crack (5.14b) in Canyonlands, Utah, FA by Tom Randall and Pete Whittaker in 2011.

Cobra Crack (5.14b/c, 8c/+) in Squamish, British Columbia, FA by Sonnie Trotter in 2006.

Echo Wall (5.14b) on Ben Nevis, Scotland, first ascent by Dave MacLeod in 2008.

See also

History of rock climbing
List of grade milestones in rock climbing

References

External links 
VIDEO: Tribe Might Be the Hardest Trad Route in the World—But No One Will Grade It, Climbing (April 2021)
VIDEO: Watch Five Traditional Climbing Whippers, Gripped Magazine (February 2021)
VIDEO: Watch Five Spring Traditional Climbing Whippers, Gripped Magazine (April 2022)

Types of climbing
Climbing techniques
Types of Mountaineering